Critique of political economy or simply the first critique of economy is a form of social critique that rejects the conventional ways of distributing resources. The critique also rejects what its advocates believe are unrealistic economic axioms, faulty historical assumptions,  and taking conventional economic mechanisms as a given
or as transhistorical (true for all human societies for all time). The critique asserts the conventional economy is merely one of many types of historically specific ways to distribute resources, which emerged along with modernity (post-Renaissance Western society).

Critics of political economy do not necessarily aim to create their own theories regarding how to administer economies. Critics of economy commonly view "the economy" as a bundle of concepts and societal and normative practices, rather than being the result of any self-evident economic laws. Hence, they also tend to consider the views which are commonplace within the field of economics as faulty, or simply as pseudoscience.

There are multiple critiques of political economy today, but what they have in common is critique of what critics of political economy tend to view as dogma, i.e. claims of the economy as a necessary and transhistorical societal category.

John Ruskin 

In the 1860s, John Ruskin published his essay Unto This Last which he came to view as his central work. The essay was originally written as a series of publications in a magazine, which ended up having to suspend the publications, due to the severe controversy the articles caused. While Ruskin is generally known as an important art critic, his study of the history of art was a component that gave him some insight into the pre-modern societies of the Middle Ages, and their social organisation which he was able to contrast to his contemporary condition. Ruskin attempted to mobilize a methodological/scientific critique of new political economy, as it was envisaged by the classical economists.

Ruskin viewed the concept of "the economy" as a kind of "collective mental lapse or collective concussion", and he viewed the emphasis on precision in industry as a kind of slavery. Due to the fact that Ruskin regarded the political economy of his time as "mad", he said that it interested him as much as "a science of gymnastics which had as its axiom that human beings in fact didn't have skeletons." Ruskin declared that economics rests on positions that are exactly the same. According to Ruskin, these axioms resemble thinking, not that human beings do not have skeletons but rather that they consist entirely of skeletons. Ruskin wrote that he didn't oppose the truth value of this theory, he merely wrote that he denied that it could be successfully implemented in the world in the state it was in. He took issue with the ideas of "natural laws", "economic man", and the prevailing notion of value and aimed to point out the inconsistencies in the thinking of the economists. He critiqued John Stuart Mill for thinking that "the opinions of the public" was reflected adequately by market prices.

Ruskin coined illth to refer to unproductive wealth. Ruskin is not well known as a political thinker today but when in 1906 a journalist asked the first generation of Labour Party members of Parliament in the United Kingdom which book had most inspired them, Unto This Last emerged as an undisputed chart-topper.

Criticism 
Karl Marx and Friedrich Engels regarded much of Ruskin's critique as reactionary. His idealisation of the Middle Ages made them reject him as a "feudal utopian".

Karl Marx 

In the 21st century, Marx is probably the most famous critic of political economy, with his three-volume magnum opus, Capital: A Critique of Political Economy, as one of his most famous books. Marx's companion Engels also engaged in critique of political economy in his 1844 Outlines of a Critique of Political Economy, which helped lay down some of the foundation for what Marx was to take further.

In contrast to the classics of political economy, Marx was concerned with lifting the ideological veil of surface phenomena and exposing the norms, axioms, social relations, institutions, and so on, that reproduced capital.

The central works in Marx's critique of political economy are Grundrisse, A Contribution to the Critique of Political Economy and Das Kapital. Marx's works are often explicitly named for example: A Contribution to the Critique of Political Economy, or Capital: A Critique of Political Economy. Marx cited Engels' article Outlines of a Critique of Political Economy several times in Das Kapital. Trotskyists and other Leninists tend to implicitly or explicitly argue that these works constitute and or contain "economical theories", which can be studied independently. This was also the common understanding of Marx's work on economy that was put forward by Soviet orthodoxy. Since this is the case, it remains a matter of controversy whether Marx's critique of political economy is to be understood as a critique of the political economy or, according to the orthodox interpretation another theory of economics. The critique of political economy is considered the most important and central project within Marxism which has led to, and continues to lead to a large number of advanced approaches within and outside academic circles.

Foundational concepts 
 Labour and capital are historically specific forms of social relations, and labour is not the source of all wealth.
 Labour is the other side of the same coin as capital, labour presupposes capital, and capital presupposes labour.
 Money is not in any way something transhistorical or natural, which goes for the whole economy as well as the other categories specific to the mode of production), and its gains in value are constituted due to social relations rather than any inherent qualities.
 The individual does not exist in some form of vacuum but is rather enmeshed in social relations.

Marx's critique of the quasi-religious and ahistorical methodology of economists 
Marx described the view of contemporaneous economists and theologians on social phenomena as similarly unscientific.

Marx continued to emphasize the ahistorical thought of the modern economists in the Grundrisse, where he among other endeavors, critiqued the liberal economist Mill. Marx also viewed the viewpoints which implicitly regarded the institutions of modernity as transhistorical as fundamentally deprived of historical understanding.

According to the french philosopher Jacques Rancière, what Marx understood, and what the economists failed to recognise was that the value-form is not something essential, but merely a part of the capitalist mode of production.

On scientifically adequate research 
Marx offered a critique regarding the idea of people being able to conduct scientific research in this domain. He wrote:

On vulgar economists 
Marx criticized what he regarded as the false critique of political economy of his contemporaries, sometimes even more forcefully than when he critiqued the classical economists he described as vulgar economists. In Marx's view, the errors of some socialist authors led the workers' movement astray. He rejected Ferdinand Lassalle's iron law of wages, which he regarded as mere phraseology. He also rejected Pierre-Joseph Proudhon's attempts to do what Hegel did for religion, law, and so on for political economy, as well as regarding what is social as subjective, and what was societal as merely subjective abstractions.

Interpretations of Marx's critique of political economy 
Some scholars view Marx's critique as being a critique of commodity fetishism and the manner in which this concept expresses a criticism of modernity and its modes of socialisation. Other scholars who engage with Marx's critique of political economy affirm the critique might assume a more Kantian sense, which transforms "Marx's work into a foray concerning the imminent antinomies that lie at the heart of capitalism, where politics and economy intertwine in impossible ways."

Contemporary Marxian 
Regarding contemporary Marxian critiques of political economy, these are generally accompanied by a rejection of the more naturalistically influenced readings of Marx, as well as other readings later deemed  (worldview Marxism), that was popularised as late as toward the end of the 20th century.

According to some scholars in this field, contemporary critiques of political economy and contemporary German Ökonomiekritik have been at least partly neglected in the anglophone world.

Feminism 
There has been a growing literature of feminist viewpoints in examinations of the foundations of political economy in the 21st century.

According to economist Julie A. Nelson, feminist critiques of economics should start from the premise that "economics, like any science, is socially constructed." Feminist economists say that social constructs act to privilege male-identified, Western, and heterosexual interpretations of economics. They generally incorporate feminist theory and frameworks to show how traditional economics communities signal expectations regarding appropriate participants, to the exclusion of outsiders. Such criticisms extend to the theories, methodologies and research areas of economics, in order to show that accounts of economic life are deeply influenced by biased histories, social structures, norms, cultural practices, interpersonal interactions, and politics.

Feminist economists often make a critical distinction that masculine bias in economics is primarily a result of gender, not sex.

Differences between critics of economy and critics of economical issues 
One may differentiate between those who engage in critique of political economy, which takes on a more ontological character, where authors criticise the fundamental concepts and social categories which reproduce the economy as an entity. While other authors, which the critics of political economy would consider only to deal with the surface phenomena of the economy, have a naturalized understanding of these social processes. Hence the epistemological differences between critics of economy and economists can also at times be very large.

In the eyes of the critics of political economy, the critics of economic issues merely critique certain practices in attempts to implicitly or explicitly rescue the political economy; these authors might for example propose universal basic income or to implement a planned economy.

Others

Contemporary

Sociologists 
 Orlando Patterson, John Cowles professor of sociology at Harvard University, argues that economics is a pseudoscience.

Philosophers 
 Slavoj Žižek

Historians 
 Moishe Postone

Historical

Historians 
 Thomas Carlyle
 Roman Rozdolsky

Poets 
 Carl Jonas Love Almqvist
 August Strindberg

Miscellaneous 
 Paul Lafargue

See also 
 Anti-work
 Hans-Georg Backhaus
 Helmut Reichelt
 Moishe Postone
 Neue Marx-Lektüre

References

Bibliography 
 
 Johnsdotter S, Carlbom A, editors. Goda sanningar: debattklimatet och den kritiska forskningens villkor. Lund: Nordic Academic Press;  2010.
 Braudel F. Kapitalismens dynamik. (La Dynamique du Capitalisme) [Ny utg.]. Göteborg: Daidalos;  2001.
 Ankarloo D, editor. Marx ekonomikritik. Stockholm: Tidskriftsföreningen Fronesis;  2008.
 Eklund K. Vår ekonomi: en introduktion till världsekonomin. Upplaga 15. Lund: Studentlitteratur;  2020.
 Tidskriftsföreningen Fronesis. Arbete. Stockholm: Tidskriftsfören. Fronesis;  2002.
 Baudrillard J. The Mirror of Production. Telos Press;  1975.
 Marx K. Till kritiken av den politiska ekonomin. [Ny utg.]. Göteborg: Proletärkultur; 1981.

Further reading

Articles

General articles 
 Mortensen, Anders – Att göra "penningens genius till sin slaf". Om Carl Jonas Love Almqvists romantiska ekonomikritik – Vetenskapssocieteten i Lund. Årsbok (in Swedish).

Scholarly articles 
 Granberg, Magnus "Reactionary radicalism and the analysis of worker subjectivity in Marx's critique of political economy"

Books

Critique of political economy 
 Baudrillard, Jean – The Mirror of Production
 Baudrillard, Jean – For a Critique of the Political Economy of the Sign
 Bonefield Werner (2014) – Critical Theory and the Critique of Political Economy: On Subversion and Negative Reason
 Gibson-Graham, J. K. – The End of Capitalism (As We Knew It): A Feminist Critique of Political Economy
 Bernard Steigler – For a New Critique of Political Economy

On Marx critique of political economy 
 Murray, Patrick (2016) – The mismeasure of wealth – Essays on Marx and social form  Brill
 Pepperell, Nicole (2010) – Disassembling Capita], RMIT University
 Postone, Moishe (1993) – Time, Labor and Social Domination

Neue Marx-Lektüre

History 
 Bryer, Robert – Accounting for History in Marx's Capital: The Missing Link
 Kurz, Robert, 1943–2012, Schwarzbuch Kapitalismus: ein Abgesang auf die Marktwirtschaft (also known as: The Satanic Mills) – 2009 – Erweit. Neuasg. 
 Pilling, Geoff - Marx's Capital, Philosophy and Political Economy

Classic works 
 
 Marx, Karl – Grundrisse
 Ruskin, John, Unto this Last LibriVox.

Essays 
 Postone, Moishe – Necessity, Labor and Time: A Reinterpretation of the Marxian Critique of Capitalism

External links 
 1995–2004 Conference Papers – Critique Of Political Economy / International Working Group on Value Theory (COPE-IWGVT)
 A collection of material related to Marx critique of political economy
 Critique of Political Economy – a 2016 edition of the philosophy journal: crisis and critique
  A lecture regarding Marx's critique of political economy.
 Translated texts from a contemporary German group critical of political economy

Criticisms
Critique of political economy
Philosophy of economics
Social philosophy